Rowena Fulham (née Nutira) (born 18 May 1960) is a former association football player who represented New Zealand at international level and went on to become a renowned coach. Fulham was named coach of the year 3 years running in Canterbury, winning the league, cup double 3 years running. Fulham went on to gain her International coaching license and assisted both Allan Jones with the NZ Senior Women in 2006 and Paul Temple with the U17 at the FIFA U17 World cup hosted in NZ in 2008 

Fulham scored on her Football Ferns début with a glancing header from an Ingrid Hall corner, in a 1–2 loss to Australia on 4 October 1981, a warm up match 1 week out from the 1981 Invitational World Cup in Taiwan, and finished her international career with eight caps and four goals to her credit.

References

1960 births
Place of birth missing (living people)
Living people
New Zealand women's association footballers
New Zealand women's international footballers
Women's association football forwards